Puyuhuapi (from the Mapudungun puye, small fish and huapi, island), also Cai Channel (NGA UFI=-897934) is a sea channel separating Magdalena Island from the mainland of Aysén del General Carlos Ibáñez del Campo Region in Chile. The channel runs through a branch of the Liquiñe-Ofqui Fault. The main settlement in the channel is Puerto Cisnes.

See also
 List of fjords, channels, sounds and straits of Chile

Straits of Chile
Bodies of water of Aysén Region